Gonakadet or Konakadeit, commonly referred to as the Sea-Wolf,  is a mythical creature in the Tlingit tradition
of the Pacific Northwest Coast of North America. Also known as Wasgo by the Haida people. Simultaneously strong, generous and humble, the Sea-Wolf was said to bring great luck and wealth to anyone fortunate enough to spy it, or hear its soulful howl.

According to artist Herem, Gonakadet myth is found among the Tsimshian, Tlingit and Haida peoples of British Columbia and Alaska and concerns the story of a sea-monster who is a transformed human being. It is a complex and varied story, but for sighting of Gonakadet either in his monster form, or in the form of his splendid undersea house which sometimes rises above the waters, means the acquisition of wealth and good fortune."

Mythical creatures Gonakadet and Wasgowere were inspired by real life pescatarian Sea wolves, which are found in the Great Bear Rainforest and in northern Vancouver Island, within the Pacific Northwest Coast of North America.

References

Sea monsters
Tlingit mythology
Haida mythology
Tsimshian mythology